Aporus unicolor, common name cutpurse, is a highly specialised spider hunting wasp from the family Pompilidae.

Description
Spinola originally thought that there were two species A. unicolor and A bicolor but we now know that these are the female and male respectively.  Both sexes are largely bluish black with dusky wings, but the male has a reddish-brown abdomen with a black tip.  The female is about 10 mm in length.

Biology
Aporus unicolor is a specialised hunter in that it has only one recorded prey, the purse-web spider Atypus affinis. The female A. affinis can live for up to eight years in its subterranean silky tubular web, to which A. unicolor gains access by using its specialised enlarged fore-femur. Once in, the wasp stings the spider to paralyse it, lays an egg on her and promptly leaves the sac in which her larva develops by eating the spider.

The adult wasps feed on the nectar of Umbellifers such as wild carrot, wild parsnip and rock samphire.

Habitat
In Great Britain this is a species where the majority of modern records are coastal, and inland records have declined probably due to habitat loss. On the coast, the habitat is typically cliffs and landslips, while inland the habitat is well-grazed downland and heathland It appears to be thermophilic and shows a strong preference for south-facing slopes and banks in sunny locations.

Distribution
In Great Britain A unicolor is confined to southern England from Cornwall in the west to Kent north to Cambridgeshire  with recent records in South Wales and the Channel Islands.  In mainland Europe A unicolor has been recorded in the western and central Europe east to Hungary and south as far as northern Italy.

Common name
The common name, cutpurse, is a neologism which was the winner of a prize to name a species in The Guardian in 2012.

References

External links
Images can be found at http://xespok.net/hymenoptera/main.php/v/Pompilidae/Pompilinae/Aporus/ and https://www.flickr.com/photos/14260865@N07/1797407983/

Hymenoptera of Europe
Pompilinae
Insects described in 1808